The 2021 Il Lombardia was a road cycling one-day race that took place on 9 October 2021 in Italy. It was the 115th edition of Il Lombardia and the 37th event of the 2021 UCI World Tour. It was won by Tadej Pogačar in the sprint against Fausto Masnada. In the chasing group Adam Yates won the sprint for third place.

Teams 
Twenty-five teams, consisting of all 19 UCI WorldTour teams and 7 UCI Professional Continental teams, of seven riders participated in the race.

Result

References

Il Lombardia
Il Lombardia
Il Lombardia
Giro di Lombardia